Emirşah is a village in Anamur district of Mersin Province, Turkey. At  it is northwest of Anamur.  Although still a separate legal entity, it is about to merge with Anamur. The population of the village is 797 as of 2011. The name of the village is composed of two Islamic titles, emir (lord) and şah (king). However, there is no historical record of any Islamic lordship centered  in or around Emirşah; the origin of the name is therefore unknown. The village is also popularly known as "Ceritler'". This name refers to a rebellious Turkmen tribe which was forced to settle in various localities by the Ottoman government. The ruins of two churches in the village show that Greeks also lived in the village in the past. Like most villages in the surrounding area, Emirşah specializes in greenhouse agriculture and banana plantations.

References

Villages in Anamur District